National Route 285 is a national highway of Japan connecting Akita, Akita and Kazuno, Akita in Japan, with a total length of 116 km (72.08 mi).

References

National highways in Japan
Roads in Akita Prefecture